Randy Smith may refer to:

Sports personalities
Randy Smith (basketball) (1948–2009), American chosen NBA All-Star Game Most Valuable Player in 1978; career lasted 1971–83
Randy Smith (baseball) (born 1963), American executive; General Manager of San Diego Padres (1993–95) and Detroit Tigers (1996–02)
Randy Smith (ice hockey), British League Premier Division winner of the Player of the Year trophy for 1994–95 and 1995–96
 Randy Smith (racing driver) American race car driver

Others
N. Randy Smith (born 1949), American jurist; appointed by President George W. Bush in 2007 to the U.S. Court of Appeals for the Ninth Circuit 
Randy Smith (game designer) (born 1974), American computer game expert who worked on the Thief series for Looking Glass Studios
Randy Smith (politician) (born 1960), American state legislator in West Virginia
Randy Smith (Oregon politician), American farmer and member of the Oregon Legislative Assembly during the 1970s

See also
Randall Smith (disambiguation)